The 4th edition of the annual TNT - Fortuna Meeting took place on 15 and 16 June 2010 in Kladno, Czech Republic. The track and field competition, featuring a decathlon (men) and a heptathlon (women) event was part of the 2010 IAAF World Combined Events Challenge. The 2010 edition was the first in history of Kladno meeting to gain the top-level IAAF World Combined Events Challenge rank.

Men's Decathlon

Schedule 

15 June

16 June

Records

Results

Women's Heptathlon

Schedule 

15 June

16 June

Records

Results

See also 

 2010 European Athletics Championships – Men's decathlon
 2010 European Athletics Championships – Women's heptathlon

References

External links 
 Official results at www.iaaf.org
 Official results at www.desetibo-kladno.cz
 Gordon, Ed (13 June 2010) Clay and Šebrle top the field in Kladno – IAAF Combined Events Challenge. IAAF. Retrieved on 24 June 2010.
 Gordon, Ed (16 June 2010). Kasyanov and Melnychenko the overnight leaders in Kladno, injuries knock out Clay and Sebrle – IAAF Combined Events Challenge. IAAF. Retrieved on 24 June 2010.
 Gordon, Ed (16 June 2010). Kasyanov and Klučinová take Kladno titles – IAAF Combined Events Challenge. IAAF. Retrieved on 24 June 2010.

TNT – Fortuna Meeting
TNT - Fortuna Meeting
TNT - Fortuna Meeting